Sericostoma is a genus of bushtailed caddisflies in the family Sericostomatidae. There are at least 20 described species in Sericostoma.

Species

References

Further reading

 
 
 
 

Trichoptera genera
Integripalpia